Terry Farrell may refer to:

 Terry Farrell (actress) (born 1963), American actress and former fashion model
 Sir Terry Farrell (architect) (born 1938), British architect
 Terry Farrell (politician) (born 1960), Canadian politician

See also
 Terry R. Ferrell